An All-American team is an honorary sports team composed of the best amateur players of a specific season for each team position—who in turn are given the honorific "All-America" and typically referred to as "All-American athletes", or simply "All-Americans". Although the honorees generally do not compete together as a unit, the term is used in U.S. team sports to refer to players who are selected by members of the national media.  Walter Camp selected the first All-America team in the early days of American football in 1889.  The 2018 NCAA Men's Basketball All-Americans are honorary lists that include All-American selections from the Associated Press (AP), the United States Basketball Writers Association (USBWA), the Sporting News (TSN), and the National Association of Basketball Coaches (NABC) for the 2017–18 NCAA Division I men's basketball season. All selectors choose at least a first and second 5-man team. The NABC, TSN and AP choose third teams, while AP also lists honorable mention selections.

The Consensus 2018 College Basketball All-American team is determined by aggregating the results of the four major All-American teams as determined by the National Collegiate Athletic Association (NCAA). Since United Press International was replaced by TSN in 1997, the four major selectors have been the aforementioned ones. AP has been a selector since 1948, NABC since 1957 and USBWA since 1960.  To earn "consensus" status, a player must win honors based on a point system computed from the four different all-America teams. The point system consists of three points for first team, two points for second team and one point for third team. No honorable mention or fourth team or lower are used in the computation. The top five totals plus ties are first team and the next five plus ties are second team.

Although the aforementioned lists are used to determine consensus honors, there are numerous other All-American lists. The ten finalists for the John Wooden Award are described as Wooden All-Americans. The ten finalists for the Senior CLASS Award are described as Senior All-Americans.  Other All-American lists include those determined by USA Today, Fox Sports, Yahoo! Sports and many others. The scholar-athletes selected by College Sports Information Directors of America (CoSIDA) are termed Academic All-Americans.

2018 Consensus All-America team
PG – Point guard
SG – Shooting guard
PF – Power forward
SF – Small forward
C – Center

Individual All-America teams

By player

By team

AP Honorable Mention:

Jaylen Adams, St. Bonaventure
Peyton Aldridge, Davidson
Grayson Allen, Duke
Mo Bamba, Texas
Trae Bell-Haynes, Vermont
Joel Berry II, North Carolina
Bogdan Bliznyuk, Eastern Washington
Desonta Bradford, East Tennessee St.
Tony Carr, Penn State
Gary Clark, Cincinnati
Xavier Cooks, Winthrop
Jermaine Crumpton, Canisius
Clayton Custer, Loyola (Illinois)
Mike Daum, South Dakota State
Ángel Delgado, Seton Hall
Kahlil Dukes, Niagara
Tre'Shaun Fletcher, Toledo
Marcus Foster, Creighton
Brandon Goodwin, Florida Gulf Coast
Isaac Haas, Purdue
Aaron Holiday, UCLA
Jordan Howard, Central Arkansas
Jemerrio Jones, New Mexico State
Nick King, Middle Tennessee
Kevin Knox, Kentucky
Fletcher Magee, Wofford
Caleb Martin, Nevada
Kelan Martin, Butler
Yante Maten, Georgia
Martaveous McKnight, Arkansas–Pine Bluff
Kendrick Nunn, Oakland
Shamorie Ponds, St. John's
Jerome Robinson, Boston College
Junior Robinson, Mount St. Mary's
Collin Sexton, Alabama
Landry Shamet, Wichita State
T. J. Shorts, UC Davis
D'Marcus Simonds, Georgia State
Jonathan Stark, Murray State
Brandon Tabb, Bethune–Cookman
Zach Thomas, Bucknell
Seth Towns, Harvard
Allonzo Trier, Arizona
Grant Williams, Tennessee
Johnathan Williams, Gonzaga
Justin Wright-Foreman, Hofstra

Academic All-Americans
On March 12, 2018, the College Sports Information Directors of America (CoSIDA) announced the 2018 Academic All-America team, with Jevon Carter headlining the NCAA Division I team as the men's college basketball Academic All-American of the Year.  The following is the 2017–18 Academic All-America Division I Men’s Basketball Team as selected by CoSIDA:

Senior All-Americans
The ten finalists for the Senior CLASS Award are called Senior All-Americans. The first and second teams, as well as the award winner, were announced during the lead-in to the Final Four. The overall award winner is indicated in bold type.

First team

Second team

References

All-Americans
NCAA Men's Basketball All-Americans